Annovka is a rural locality (a selo) and the administrative centre of Annovsky Selsoviet, Belebeyevsky District, Bashkortostan, Russia. The population was 325 as of 2010. There are 4 streets.

Geography 
Annovka is located 18 km north of Belebey (the district's administrative centre) by road. Krasnorechka is the nearest rural locality.

References 

Rural localities in Belebeyevsky District